The 2016 FIBA 3x3 World Championships, hosted by China, was an international 3x3 basketball event that featured separate competitions for men's and women's national teams. The tournament was run between 11 and 15 October 2016, in Guangzhou outside the Tianhe Sport Complex. It was co-organized by the FIBA.

Host selection
On May 10, 2015, FIBA announced the Guangzhou as host city of the 2016 tournament.

Medalists

Participating teams
The FIBA 3x3 Federation Ranking was used as basis to determine the participating FIBA member associations. China as hosts automatically qualifies in both men's and women's tournament while the Qatar and the United States winners of the 2014 edition in the men's and women's tournaments respectively.

The pools for the tournaments were unveiled on 20 September 2016.

Men

Women

References

External links
Official website

 
2016
2016 in 3x3 basketball
2016–17 in Chinese basketball
Sports competitions in Guangzhou
International basketball competitions hosted by China
October 2016 sports events in Asia